A strong electrolyte is a solution/solute that completely, or almost completely, ionizes or dissociates in a solution.  These ions are good conductors of electric current in the solution.

Originally, a "strong electrolyte" was defined as a chemical that, when in aqueous solution, is a good conductor of electricity. With a greater understanding of the properties of ions in solution, its definition was replaced by the present one.

A concentrated solution of this strong electrolyte has a lower vapor pressure than that of pure water at the same temperature. Strong acids, strong bases and soluble ionic salts that are not weak acids or weak bases are strong electrolytes. 

A substance whose aqueous solution or molten state decomposed into ions by passing electricity is known as electrolytes.

Writing reactions 
For strong electrolytes, a single reaction arrow shows that the reaction occurs completely in one direction, in contrast to the dissociation of weak electrolytes, which both ionize and re-bond in significant quantities.

Strong electrolyte(aq) → Cation+(aq) + Anion−(aq)

Strong electrolytes conduct electricity only when molten or in aqueous solutions.
Strong electrolytes break apart into ions completely.

The stronger an electrolyte the greater the voltage produced when used in a galvanic cell.

Examples 

Strong Acids
 Perchloric acid HClO4
 Hydriodic acid HI
 Hydrobromic acid HBr
 Hydrochloric acid HCl
 Sulfuric acid H2SO4
 Nitric acid HNO3
 Chloric acid HClO3
 Bromic acid HBrO3
 Perbromic acid HBrO4
 Periodic acid HIO4
 Fluoroantimonic acid HSbF6
 Magic acid FSO3HSbF5
 Carborane superacid H(CHB11Cl11)
 Fluorosulfuric acid FSO3H
 Triflic acid CF3SO3H

Strong Bases
 Lithium hydroxide LiOH
 Sodium hydroxide NaOH
 Potassium hydroxide KOH
 Rubidium hydroxide RbOH
 Caesium hydroxide CsOH
 Calcium hydroxide Ca(OH)2
 Strontium hydroxide Sr(OH)2
 Barium hydroxide Ba(OH)2
 Lithium diisopropylamide (LDA) C6H14LiN
 Lithium diethylamide (LDEA)
 Sodium amide NaNH2
 Sodium hydride NaH
 Lithium bis(trimethylsilyl)amide ((CH3)3Si)2NLi

Salts
 Sodium chloride NaCl
 Potassium nitrate KNO3
 Magnesium chloride MgCl2
 Sodium acetate CH3COONa

See also
Electrolyte
Dissociation constant

References

Electrolytes

ru:Электролитическая диссоциация#Сильные электролиты